The 2001 Volvo PGA Championship was the 47th edition of the Volvo PGA Championship, an annual professional golf tournament on the European Tour. It was held 25–28 May at the West Course of Wentworth Club in Virginia Water, Surrey, England, a suburb southwest of London.

Andrew Oldcorn won by two strokes over Ángel Cabrera to claim his first Volvo PGA Championship.

Course layout

Past champions in the field 
Ten former champions entered the tournament.

Made the cut

Missed the cut

Nationalities in the field

Round summaries

First round 
Thursday, 25 May 2001

Second round 
Friday, 26 May 2001

Third round 
Saturday, 27 May 2001

Final round 
Sunday, 28 May 2001

Scorecard

Cumulative tournament scores, relative to par

Source:

References 

BMW PGA Championship
Golf tournaments in England
Volvo PGA Championship
Volvo PGA Championship
Volvo PGA Championship